Whitecloud (also spelled White Cloud) is an unincorporated community in Nodaway County, in the U.S. state of Missouri.  It is about 12 miles south of Maryville, Missouri, the county seat, being just west of US Route 71.

This is not to be confused with the White Cloud located in Hickory County, Missouri which is north-northwest of Hermitage, Missouri, the Hickory County seat.

History
A post office called White Cloud was established in 1856, and remained in operation until 1901. The community was named after nearby White Cloud Creek.

References

Unincorporated communities in Nodaway County, Missouri
Unincorporated communities in Missouri